Ludwik Ćwikliński (17 July 1853 in Gnesen (Gniezno), Province of Posen, Kingdom of Prussia – 3 October 1942 in Kraków) was a classical philologist, professor and rector of Lviv University (1893-1894), editor of "Eos" magazine (1894-1901). Between 1899 and 1902 he was a member of the Austrian parliament, and he was the Austrian Minister of Education between 1917 and 1918.

1853 births
1942 deaths
People from Gniezno
Polish philologists
People from the Province of Posen
University of Lviv rectors